The  Labbadeh,  also spelled as Lebbadeh, Lubbaddah, Labbade or Labbada  is a conical brimless felt cap traditionally worn by Lebanese men.

It is made from sheep's wool and is usually combined with a black scarf during work and with a white silk scarf for celebratory, leisure and formal events. It is sometimes also given an agal at the top for stability.

The origin of the labbadeh goes back to ancient times where it was first worn by the Phoenicians with depictions of it having been found in Byblos,  Kamid al-Lawz, Aleppo and Tel Michal.

The fashion persisted into medieval times among the Maronites of Northern Mount Lebanon, where it was especially useful for its natural water-resistance against rain and providing warmth during the cold winters of the mountain. The labbadeh survived into the modern era still being used by some villagers as well as becoming a national symbol of Lebanon as a part of the traditional folk costume of the country.

Etymology
The word labbadeh comes from the Lebanese word libada which translates to "beat" or "beaten" and is a reference to the beating of wool in the process of making a labbade.

Process
The making of the labbadeh is a hand-made felting process. First, the wool threads must be finely separated from one another before being saturated with soap and water. Then, the wool threads are mixed together again and beaten until they solidify into a labbade. The finished product is then soaked with water and put out to dry.

Gallery

See also
 Qeleshe, similar headdress of Albanian origin
 Pileus
 Baalbeck International Festival
 Tantour, traditional Lebanese women's headdress

References

External links

Headgear
Hats
Middle Eastern clothing
Lebanese fashion